Hawthorne Cottage is a National Historic Site located in Brigus, Newfoundland and Labrador.  It is a unit of the national park system, operated by Parks Canada, the national park service. It was the residence of Captain Bob Bartlett, a famed Arctic explorer. Bartlett is credited by marine historian Thomas Appleton with "the finest feat of leadership in Canadian Marine history" in his efforts to save the crew of the ill–fated Karluk under Arctic explorer Vilhjalmur Stefansson.

Built in 1830 by Brigus merchant John Leamon, Hawthorne Cottage came into the Bartlett family through Bartlett's mother, Mary Leamon Bartlett, granddaughter of John Leamon. In 1834 the house was moved 10 kilometers from its original site in Cochranedale to its current location in the centre of Brigus. In the neighborhood is a house that was known as the Benville Tearooms, once operated by Bartlett's mother and sisters.

The cottage combines features of Newfoundland vernacular architecture enhanced by intricate architectural details. The architecture of Hawthorne has been recognized by the national Historic Sites and Monuments Board as typifying the refined lifestyle of Newfoundland outport merchant families of the 19th and early 20th centuries.  It was designated a National Historic Site in 1978, and has been a Federal Heritage Building since 1993. The Historic Sites Association of Newfoundland and Labrador ran a small gift shop inside, which has closed.

See also 
 List of communities in Newfoundland and Labrador
 List of people of Newfoundland and Labrador

References

External links 
Hawthorne Cottage National Historic Site - Parks Canada official site
www.historicsites.ca- Historic Sites Association official site - Hawthorne Cottage under projects

National Historic Sites in Newfoundland and Labrador
Museums in Newfoundland and Labrador
Historic house museums in Canada
Biographical museums in Canada
Houses in Newfoundland and Labrador
Houses completed in 1830
1830 establishments in Newfoundland